imo is a proprietary audio/video calling and instant messaging software service. It allows sending music, video, PDFs and other files, along with various free stickers. It supports encrypted group video and voice calls with up to 20 participants. According to its developer, the service possesses over 200 million users and over 50 million messages per day are sent through it.

History 
The product was created as a web-based application in 2005 for accessing multiple chat platforms, including Facebook Messenger, Google Talk, Yahoo! Messenger, and Skype chat. It was developed by PageBites, and required one's phone number to verify the users' account. In March 2014, support for all third-party messaging networks ended.

In January 2018, the app reached 500 million installs.

See also
 List of social platforms with at least 100 million active users

References

External links

Mobile applications
Android (operating system) software
IOS software
Windows instant messaging clients
Cross-platform software
Instant messaging clients
Social media
2007 software